Guo Songling (1883 – 24 December 1925) was a Chinese general who served in the Fengtian Army under Zhang Zuolin during the Chinese Warlord Era. A republican sympathiser who briefly served under Sun Yat-Sen, he was a teacher of and an important influence on Zhang Zuolin's son, Zhang Xueliang. Citing desire to avoid civil war, he led a three-month rebellion against Zhang Zuolin which led to his defeat and execution.

Youth and formative years
Guo Songling was born in 1883 in a village on the outskirts of Mukden, the capital of Fengtian Province, Qing China, which is modern day Shengyang, with a traditional ancestral hometown of Taiyuan in Central China.

In 1905, the Viceroy of Manchuria Zhao Erxun set up the Fengtian Primary Army School, to which 22 year old Guo Songling was admitted. On high marks, he was recommended the following year to enter the Baoding Military Academy, Northern China's premier military academy. In 1907, he graduated and joined the  Qing Dynasty's Qing New Army as a sergeant in Mukden.

In 1909, general Zhu Qinglan became the guard commander, and Zhu became a close patron of Guo. When Zhu's post was rotated, Guo followed Zhu to a new post in Sichuan province. In divisions overseen by Zhu, the revolutionary secret society Chinese Revolutionary League (Tongmenghui), was active and was tolerated. Guo Songling joined the Tongmenghui in 1910.

Military career 
In 1911, during the Railway Protection Movement, the Sichuan Tongmenghui erupted in protest against the Qing government, encircling Chengdu. Guo Songling however did not participate in this uprising and, now the battalion commander for Northern Chengdu, was able to diplomatically put it down without bloodshed. Suspected of republican sympathies, Guo Songling
was relieved of his command by Sichuan Governor-General Zhao Erfeng, only recovering it after the appeals of his patron Zhu Qinglan. Late in the same year, the Xinhai Revolution broke out and spread to Sichuan. Sichuan declared independence and in Chengdu formed the "Chinese Military Government of Sichuan". During this period out-of-province officers like Zhu Qinglan were pushed out of the military government in favor of local Sichuanese officers. With his patron removed, Guo Songling resigned decided to return to Manchuria.

Constitution Protection Movement 
In July 1917, Sun Yat-Sen declared the Constitution Protection Movement in opposition to the Beiyang clique warlords that had taken over the national government, establishing a military government in Guangzhou. Guo's patron Zhu Qinglan allied himself with Sun and took up a post as governor of Guangdong Province under Sun, and Guo Songlian followed his mentor to Guangdong. During this period Guo served on the staff of the Guangdong, Guangxi, and Hunan Border Supervision Offices, and the head of the Guangdong Military Battalion. As a young officer, he gained the praise of Sun Yat-Sen. In May 1918, Sun Yat-Sen dissolved the Guangzhou military government under pressure from warlords, and Guo Songlian returned to Fengtian.

Fengtian Clique General 
In 1919, Zhang Zuolin formed the Manchurian Army Military Academy 东三省陆军讲武堂, and Guo Songling was appointed as instructor in military tactics. One of his students was Zhang Zuolin's son Zhang Xueliang, who held Guo's capability in deep esteem. In 1920, Zhang Xueliang graduated from the Military Academy and was appointed a brigade commander in the Fengtian Army, and upon Zhang Xueliang's recommendation Guo was appointed to be the younger Zhang's chief of staff.

As chief of staff, Guo trained the younger Zhang's brigade into one of the best brigades in the Fengtian army. In July of that year, the Zhili–Anhui War erupted, and Guo was appointed by Zhang Zuolin as commander of an allied force with the Zhili clique against the Anhui clique. Guo's forces decisively beat the Anhui forces in Tianjin, and he grew more and more in Zhang Zuolin's confidence.

In 1921, Zhang Zuolin expanded the Fengtian army into ten mixed brigades, with the third directed by Zhang Xueliang and the eighth directed by Guo Songling. The third and eighth brigades formed a united command, and Guo Songling took charge of operations and training for both divisions. In May 1922, the First Zhili–Fengtian War broke out, and the Fengtian clique suffered heavy losses, but the elite third and eighth brigades were able to retreat without much casualties. Afterwards Zhang Zuolin established the Army Organizational Department 陆军整理处, with Zhang Xueliang as Chief-of-Staff and Guo Songling as Acting Chief of staff, in charge of military organization, order and training.

Dissatisfaction with Zhang Zuolin and rebellion

During the Second Zhili–Fengtian War a personal grievance over a friend's removal from command caused him to retreat and nearly cost his army the war. A sense that he was being under-appreciated, along with gradual encouragement by Guominjun rival Feng Yuxiang to help put Zhang's more liberal son on the Manchurian throne, led to his mutiny in mid-1925.

Marching his division north towards Zhang's headquarters at Shenyang on 22 November, Guo met success in the early weeks of the offensive. However, when the city's Japanese garrison interfered in defence of Zhang and neither the expected popular support or assistance of the Guominjun appeared, his rebellion stalled. Within the month his forces were surrounded by the Fengtian Army and annihilated. Guo and his wife were captured on 24 December 1925 and executed the next day.

References

Sources
Dupuy, Trevor N. Harper Encyclopedia of Military Biography, New York, 1992.

1883 births
1925 deaths
Republic of China warlords from Liaoning
Politicians from Shenyang
Executed Republic of China people
Executed people from Liaoning
Members of the Fengtian clique